This is a list of seasons for the Texas Tech Lady Raiders, a women's basketball team which represents Texas Tech University.

Year by year results

Conference tournament winners noted with #
Source

Note:
 The on-court record in 1978–79 was 14–19, but due to forfeits, the official record is 8–25
 The on-court record in 1980–81 was 12–18, but due to a forfeit, the official record is 13–17

References

Texas Tech Lady Raiders basketball seasons
Lady Raiders
Texas Tech Lady Raiders basketball seasons